The men's petanque precision shooting competition in boules sports at the 2017 World Games took place from 22 to 24 July 2017 at the Centennial Hall in Wrocław, Poland.

Competition format
A total of 8 athletes entered the competition. Top 4 athletes from qualification advances to semifinals.

Results

Qualification

Finals

References 

 
2017 World Games